Henry Austin may refer to:

Henry A. Austin (1833–1911), Canadian merchant and political figure in New Brunswick
Henry W. Austin Sr. (1828–1889), American businessman and politician
Henry W. Austin (1864–1947), American politician and businessman
Henry Austin (Indian politician) (1920–2008), Indian politician and ambassador
Henry Austin alias Brasuter (fl. 1410–1413), Member of Parliament for Totnes
Henry Austin (baseball) (1844–1904), American baseball player
Bunny Austin (Henry Wilfred Austin, 1906–2000), English tennis player
Henry Austin (architect) (1804–1891), American architect
Henry Austin (poet), English poet
Henry Adrian Austin (born 1972), Barbadian cricketer
Henry Fitzherbert Austin (1874–1957), Barbadian cricketer

See also
Harry Austin (1892–1968), English cricketer
Henry Austen (disambiguation)